Boris Petrovich Gavrilov (23 March 1944 – 	7 January 2006) was a Soviet rugby union player, who played for the national team. He was a Soviet Master of Sport.

He played for Fili rugby club, and was active in the 1970s.

References
 Sorokin, A.A. (А. А. Сорокин) "Rugby" (Регби) in English translation of Great Soviet Encyclopedia (Progress Publishers, Moscow, 1978)
 Original Russian text available at   Большая советская энциклопедия: Регби

External links
 https://rugbystat.pythonanywhere.com/persons/1859/

1944 births
2006 deaths
Soviet rugby union players
Russian rugby union players
Honoured Masters of Sport of the USSR